The 50th Attack Squadron is a squadron of the United States Air Force, stationed at Shaw Air Force Base, South Carolina, where it operates the General Atomics MQ-9 Reaper unmanned aerial vehicle.  It is assigned to the 25th Attack Group, also at Shaw AFB, and a component of the 432d Wing, located at Creech Air Force Base, Nevada.

Formed in August 1917, as the 50th Aero Squadron, the unit flew observation missions in the American built de Havilland DH-4 over the battlefields of World War I. On 6 October 1918, 1Lt Harold E. Goettler and 2Lt Erwin R. Bleckley, of the 50th Aero Squadron were posthumously awarded the Medal of Honor.

During World War II as the 431st Bombardment Squadron, the unit earned the Distinguished Unit Citation and the Presidential Unit Citation for its services in the Pacific Theatre. The unit was subsequently inactivated on 20 October 1947.

The squadron was reactivated at the United States Air Force Academy on 1 October 1983 and designated the 50th Airmanship Training Squadron.  The focus of the 50th changed to the classroom, supporting the instruction of US Air Force Academy Cadets in military strategic studies as the 50th Education Squadron.

History

World War I 

The unit was first organized as the 50th Aero Squadron with 149 men at Kelly Field No. 1, Texas, on 6 August 1917.  Moved to Kelly Field No. 2 on 12 September and designated as a school squadron, personnel entering training for engine mechanics and performed field garrison duties.  Was moved back to Field No. 1 on 17 November and was designated a service squadron, being equipped with Curtiss JN-4 aircraft and pilots, and entered training for combat service in France.

On 20 December 1917, the 50th transferred from Kelly Field and ordered for overseas duty.  It moved to the Aviation Concentration Center, Camp Mills, Garden City, New York and arrived on 3 January 1918.  Departed from the United States on transport No. 508 (RMS Carmania on 9 January, arriving Liverpool, England on 24 January. Once in England, the 50th was moved to RFC Harlaxton, Lincolnshire and began advance training prior to being sent to France.  Instruction was received in aircraft rigging and engine repair, along with gunnery, radio, photography and aerial bombing.

Combat in France
 See: Erwin R. Bleckley; Harold E. Goettler; Lost Battalion (World War I)
Departure orders for France were received on 3 July 1918, the squadron departing from the port of Southampton, arriving in Le Havre, France on 14 July.  Entered service with the Air Service, AEF at the Air Service Replacement Concentration Barracks, St. Maixent on 17 July.  After receiving additional personnel, supplies and equipment, was moved to the combat flying school at the 1st Observation Group School on Amanty Airdrome on 27 July.  At Amanty, the squadron received American-built De Havilland DH-4 and after training was received on the DH-4s, the squadron was designated as a Corps Observation squadron and assigned to the I Corps Observation Group.  After a short spell at the Behonne depot, the squadron moved to Bicqueley Airdrome on 8 September for combat duty on the front. The squadron adopted the Dutch Girl insignia, trademark of Old Dutch Cleanser. To the fliers of the 50th Aero Squadron, the Dutch Girl meant one thing: "Clean up on Germany." The insignia was painted on the aircraft, and squadron members wore matching pins above the right breast pocket on their uniforms.

In combat, the mission of the 50th Aero Squadron was general surveillance of the enemy rear areas by means of both visual and photographic reconnaissance. These missions were carried out for the purpose of intelligence-gathering and informing First Army headquarters informed of enemy movements and preparations for attacks or retreats of its infantry forces. The 50th identified enemy activity along roads and railroads, ground stations, various storage dumps and airfields; the numbers of fires and activities of enemy aircraft, and the amount of anti-aircraft artillery was also monitored and reported. Due to the nature of the missions and the depths of enemy area which was penetrated, the missions were carried out at high altitudes, usually between 4,500 and 5,500 meters.

The 50th's first combat mission was flown on 12 September, being assigned for observation duties in support of the 82d and 90th Infantry Divisions as part of the St. Mihiel Offensive. It flew two artillery surveillance flights to help adjust the artillery barrage on enemy forces for the 90th Division, and also six reconnaissance missions, observing and photographing enemy forces in the rear areas and reporting that information to the 82d Division Commander.  The weather during the offensive, however, was extremely poor.  Fortunately, the enemy air activity was very slight at the beginning of the offensive, but a day or two afterwards, there was a marked increase in enemy activity.  One observer was killed in action, and one plane, with its observer and pilot failed to return during the Offensive.

After St. Mihiel, the squadron moved to the Remicourt Aerodrome in preparation for the next American offensive, in the Argonne Forest.  There it joined the 1st and 12th Aero Squadrons.  Movement to Remicourt was delayed until 24 September due to weather. On the 26th combat operations began supporting the 77th Division, the 50th Aero Squadron flew its first missions of the Meuse-Argonne Offensive with a complement of 15 pilots, 15 observers, and 16 aircraft.  Initially the aircraft flew observation or dropped messages

At the beginning of October, units of the 308th Infantry Regiment were cut off and surrounded by German troops. Able to communicate with division headquarters only by carrier pigeon, the battalion-sized force inadvertently supplied division headquarters with incorrect coordinates of its location.  On 2 October the 50th Aero Squadron searched for signs of the cut-off battalion, and on 5 October the division commander, Maj. Gen. Robert Alexander, requested that the 50th Aero Squadron locate and resupply the "Lost Battalion" by air with ammunition, rations, and medical supplies.

On 28 October, the squadron was moved from Remicourt to the new Parois Airdrome near Clermont-en-Argonne, where it continued combat operations until the 11 November Armistice with Germany.

Post World War I duty in France
After the end of hostilities, the air service in France was slow to bring their units back to the United States.  Transportation was poor, and many had to wait months to board a ship. The 50th AS was no exception, as it was split into flights and assigned to various locations in France, performing postwar service duties.

With the inactivation of the First Army Air Service, the 50th Aero Squadron was ordered demobilized.  It was ordered to report to the 1st Air Depot at Colombey-les-Belles Airdrome on 1 April 1919, to turn in all of its supplies and equipment and was relieved from duty with the AEF. The squadron's DH-4 aircraft were delivered to the Air Service Production Center No. 2. at Romorantin Aerodrome.  There practically all of the pilots and observers were detached from the squadron.  Personnel at Colombey were subsequently assigned to the Commanding General, Services of Supply and ordered to report to the staging camp at Clamecy, France on 9 April. There, personnel awaited scheduling to report to one of the Base Ports in France for transport to the United States.  It moved to the port of Marseille, France, 22 April when it boarded the SS Caserta.

Upon its arrival in New York, the squadron proceeded to Scott Field, Illinois, arriving on 27 May where its personnel were discharged and returned to civilian life.

World War I honors

Combat sectors and campaigns

Notable personnel
 Lt. Erwin Russell Bleckley, Medal of Honor (KIA)
 Lt. Harold Ernest Goettler, Medal of Honor (KIA)

 Lt. Robert M. Anderson, SSC
 Lt. David C. Beebe, SSC
 Lt. Franklin B. Bellows, DSC (KIA)

 Lt. Mitchell H. Brown, DSC, 1 aerial victory
 Lt. William D. Frayne, SSC
 Lt. George R. Phillips, DSC, 1 aerial victory

 DSC: Distinguished Service Cross; SSC: Silver Star Citation; KIA: Killed in Action

Inter-War era
A small cadre of the squadron remained at Scott Field until August 1919 when it was moved to Langley Field, Virginia. At Langley, it received De Havilland DH-4s and was assigned to the 2d Observation Wing Headquarters.  It was assigned to coastal and submarine patrol duties along the Atlantic coast.  On 1 October it was attached to the 1st Army Observation Group.

It remained active with the 2d Wing and performed demonstrations of effectiveness of aerial bombardment on naval warships, June–September 1921.  Reassigned to Mexican Border in 1927 as an aerial observation squadron at Brooks Field, San Antonio, Texas before inactivation on 1 August 1927.

The designation was then transferred to the Office of Chief of the Air Corps (OCAC). Organized in December 1927 with Organized Reserve personnel as a Regular Army Inactive (RAI) unit at Dodd Field, Texas. Relieved from assignment to OCAC 1 September 1928. Organized Reserve officers assigned to the unit participated in summer training at Kelly Field in 1928. Designated mobilization training station was Dodd Field, 1927-29. Withdrawn from the Eighth Corps Area on 27 October 1928 and allotted to the Second Corps Area. Assigned on 13 February 1929 to the 9th Observation Group. Relieved from assignment to the 9th Observation Group on 8 May 1929 and assigned to the 5th Composite Group. Organized on 27 May 1929 with Organized Reserve personnel as a RAI unit at Mitchel Field, New York.

The 50th Observation Squadron was reactivated into active service as an aerial observation and defensive patrol squadron off the coast of Oahu, Hawaii Territory, 1 November 1930, based at Luke Field, with O-19Bs as initial equipment. Remained in Hawaii as part of the Army Hawaiian Department throughout the 1930s as part of the air defenses of the islands. In 1938 it was re-designated as a Medium Range reconnaissance squadron, being attached to the 5th Bombardment Group and equipped with B-18 Bolo twin-engine bombers. Was attached to the 11th Bombardment Group in February 1940.  Beginning in early 1941, the squadron transitioned into the Boeing B-17D Flying Fortress, having the capability to fly longer reconnaissance missions from Hickam Field.

World War II

Following the Japanese attack on Pearl Harbor on 7 December 1941, the 50th was re-designated the 431st Bombardment Squadron.  In June 1942, shortly after the Battle of Midway, the 11th Group was authorized as a mobile force by the Army Air Forces in order to respond to a Navy request by Admiral Nimitz for long-range armed search planes support for locating Japanese fleets and with firepower to withstand defending Japanese fighter attacks while tracking the fleet.  As a mobile group, the 11th Group received authorization to leave Hickam Field to support Navy operations in the South Pacific Theater during the Guadalcanal and Northern Solomon Islands Campaigns.

As part of the 11th Bomb Group, the squadron moved to the New Hebrides on 22 July 1942 and temporarily becoming part of Thirteenth Air Force the end of 1942. They bombed airfields, supply dumps, ships, docks, troop positions, and other objectives in the South Pacific from July to November 1942, and received a Distinguished Unit Citation (DUC) for those operations. Continued operations attacking Japanese airfields, installations, and shipping until late March 1943.

The squadron returned to Hickam Field on 8 April 1943 and was reassigned to Seventh Air Force. Following this, the 11th Bomb Group received the Consolidated B-24 Liberator bombers, which it flew until the end of the war.  While in Hawaii, the group refitted and trained with the B-24, flying combat training missions against Wake Island and other central Pacific bases held by the Japanese. It deployed to Ellice Island on 9 November 1943 and resumed combat participating in the Allied offensive through the Gilbert, Marshall and Marianas Islands, while operating from Funafuti, Tarawa, and Kwajalein. Moved to Guam on 25 October 1944 and attacked shipping and airfields in the Volcano and Bonin Islands. Moved to Okinawa on 2 July 1945 to participate in the final phases of the air offensive against Japan, bombing railways, airfields, and harbor facilities on Kyushu and striking Japanese airfields in Eastern China.

After the war ceased the group flew reconnaissance and surveillance missions to China and ferried liberated prisoners of war from Okinawa to Luzon, Philippines.  The unit earned the Distinguished Unit Citation and the Presidential Unit Citation for its services in the Pacific.

Postwar era
After V-J Day, most squadron members returned to the United States and demobilized.  On 29 April 1946 the squadron was redesignated as the 5th Reconnaissance Squadron (Very Long Range, Photographic), and assigned to Headquarters, US Army Forces, Pacific at Fort William McKinley, Luzon, Philippines.

Transferred to the 313th Bombardment Wing at Clark Field, the 5th was equipped with F-13 Superfortress (B-29)s, F-7A Liberators (B-24J and L)s and a few F-9B Flying Fortresses (B-17F)s equipped for long range photography and mapping which had operated from Australia during the war.  The squadron's mission was to perform aerial photography and mapping over the Southwest Pacific, Southeast Asia, Korea, Japan, Philippines, Formosa, and the Pescadores, 1946–1947, some missions being clandestine over northern China, Northern Korea and the Soviet Union.

The squadron began phasing down for inactivation in 1947, with it being inactivated on 20 October 1947.

Modern era
The squadron was reactivated at the United States Air Force Academy on 1 October 1983 and designated the 50th Airmanship Training Squadron.  In November 1994 the squadron was re-designated as the 50th Training Squadron.

In 1994, the unit earned its fourth Air Force Outstanding Unit Award, three of them consecutively in its time at the Academy.  The summer of 1997 saw the last flight of the Boeing T-43A for the squadron with a change in direction for the squadron mission and a loss of funding for the Buckley ANG Base unit which supported T-43 operations. In January 2001 the squadron was re-designated the 50th Education Squadron, reflecting the squadron's change in mission.

Lineage

 Organized as the 50th Aero Squadron on 6 August 1917
 Redesignated 50th Aero Squadron (Corps Observation) on 8 September 1918
 Redesignated 50th Aero Squadron on 1 June 1919
 Redesignated 50th Squadron, Observation on 14 March 1921
 Redesignated 50th Observation Squadron on 25 January 1923
 Inactivated on 1 August 1927
 Organized in the reserve, 1 December 1927
 Inactivated in the reserve, 31 October 1930
 Activated on 1 November 1930
 Redesignated 50th Reconnaissance Squadron on 25 January 1938
 Redesignated 50th Reconnaissance Squadron (Medium Range) on 6 December 1939
 Redesignated 50th Reconnaissance Squadron (Heavy) on 20 November 1940
 Redesignated 431st Bombardment Squadron (Heavy) on 22 April 1942
 Redesignated 431st Bombardment Squadron, Heavy c. 3 August 1944
 Redesignated 5th Reconnaissance Squadron, Very Long Range, Photographic on 29 April 1946
 Inactivated on 20 October 1947
 Redesignated 50th Airmanship Training Squadron and activated on 1 October 1983
 Redesignated 50th Training Squadron on 1 November 1994
 Redesignated 50th Education Squadron on 1 January 2001
 Inactivated on 1 August 2005
 Redesignated as 50th Attack Squadron on 13 Feb 2018.
 Activated on 27 Feb 2018.

Assignments
 Post Headquarters, Kelly Field, 6 August 1917
 Aviation Concentration Center, 3 January 1918
 Air Service Headquarters, AEF, British Isles, 24 January 1918 (attached to Royal Flying Corps for training until 3 July 1918)
 Replacement Concentration Center, AEF, 17–27 July 1918
 I Corps Observation Group, 8 September 1918
 1st Air Depot, 1 April 1919
 Commanding General, Services of Supply, April–May 1919
 Post Headquarters, Mitchel Field, 1 May 1919
 Post Headquarters, Scott Field, 27 May 1919
 Post Headquarters, Langley Field, 1 August 1919
 2d Wing, September 1919 (attached to: First Army Observation Group after 1 October 1919)
 First Army Observation Group, 24 May 1920
 Attached to: 1st Provisional Air Brigade, 6 May-3 October 1921
 2nd Wing (Provisional), 8 August 1922 (attached to Air Service Field Officers' (later Air Service Tactical School; Air Corps Tactical School)
 Air Corps Training Center, June-1 August 1927
 Regular Army Inactive (RAI) Reserve (attached to Office of the Chief of the Air Corps 1 December 1927, 9th Observation Group 13 February 1929, 5th Composite Group 8 May 1929)
 5th Composite Group, 1 November 1930
 Hawaiian Dept, United States Army, 12 October 1938 (attached to 5th Bombardment Group, 11th Bombardment Group, 1 February 1940)
 11th Bombardment Group, 25 February 1942
 US Army Forces, Pacific, 29 April 1946
 313th Bombardment Wing, 15 June 1946
 5th Reconnaissance Group, 3 February – 20 October 1947
 34th Education Group, 1 October 1983 – 1 August 2005
 432d Operations Group, 27 February 2018 – 2 October 2018
 25th Attack Group, 2 October 2018 – present

Stations

 Kelly Field, Texas, 6 August-20 December 1917
 Aviation Concentration Center, Garden City, New York, 3 January 1918
 Port of Entry, Hoboken, New Jersey
 Overseas transport, RMS Carmania, 9–24 January 1918
 Romney Rest Camp, Winchester, England, 24 January 1918
 RFC Harlaxton, Lincolnshire, England, 30 January 1918
 St. Maixent Replacement Barracks, France, 17 July 1918
 Amanty Airdrome, France, 27 July 1918
 Behonne Air Depot, France, 4 September 1918 (advanced air depot of Colombey depot).
 Bicqueley Airdrome, France, 8 September 1918
 Remicourt Aerodrome, France, 24 September 1918
 Parois Airdrome, France, 28 October 1918
 Longeau aerodrome, near Langres, France, 6 December 1918
 B Flight stayed in Parois Airdrome until 18 December 1918, then moved to Clamecy before sailing back to United States.
 C Flight operated from Parois Airdrome till 12 December 1918, then moved to the "Camp de La Valbonne" (Ain department), a military training grounds near Lyons.
 Colombey-les-Belles Airdrome, France, 1 April 1919
 Clamecy, France, 9 April 1919
 Marseilles, France, 22 April 1919
 Mitchel Field, New York, 1 May 1919
 Scott Field, Illinois, 27 May 1919
 Langley Field, Virginia, August 1919

 Brooks Field, Texas, 25 June-1 August 1927
 Dodd Field, Texas, 1 December 1927
 Mitchel Field, New York, 27 May 1929
 Luke Field, Hawaii, 1 November 1930
 Hickam Field, Hawaii, 9 October 1939
 Nadi Airfield, Viti Levu, Fiji, 24 July 1942
 Air echelon operated from Luganville Airfield, Espiritu Santo, New Hebrides, August 1942
 Luganville Airfield, Espiritu Santo, New Hebrides, 1 November 1942 – 28 March 1943
 Forward echelon operated from Henderson Field (Guadalcanal), Solomon Islands, December 1942
 Hickam Field, Hawaii Territory, 8 April 1943
 Funafuti Airfield, Nanumea, Gilbert Islands, 11 November 1943
 Hawkins Field, Tarawa, Gilbert Islands, 16 January 1944
 Kwajalein Airfield, Marshall Islands, 31 March 1944
 Agana Airfield, Guam, Marianas Islands, 21 October 1944
 Kadena Airfield, Okinawa, 2 July 1945
 Fort William McKinley, Luzon, Philippines, December 1945
 Clark Field, Luzon, Philippines, 15 June 1946 – 20 October 1947
 United States Air Force Academy, Colorado, 1 October 1983 – 1 August 2005
 Shaw AFB, South Carolina, 27 Feb 2018 – present

Aircraft

 De Havilland DH-4, 1918–1919; 1919-1927
 Royal Aircraft Factory SE-5, 1919-1927
 Thomas-Morse O-19, 1930–1936
 Martin B-12, 1936-1938
 Curtiss A-3 Falcon, 1936-1938
 Boeing P-12, 1936-1938
 B-18 Bolo, 1938–1941

 B-17D Flying Fortress, 1941–1943
 B-24J Liberator, 1943–1945
 F-13 Superfortress, 1946–1947
 F-7A Liberator, 1946–1947
 F-9B Flying Fortress, 19476 – 20 October 1947
 T-43 Bobcat, 1983-1997
 MQ-9 Reaper, 2018–Present

See also

 Erwin R. Bleckley
 Harold Ernest Goettler
 List of American aero squadrons
 List of United States Air Force bomb squadrons
 Lists of World War I flying aces
 Organization of the Air Service of the American Expeditionary Force

References
 Notes

Bibliography

External links
http://www.usafa.edu/df/dfmi/50ES/50eshome.htm official unit site
 http://www.footnote.com/image/#19953694 Gorrells history

0050

cs:Letecká sekce Spojovacího sboru Spojených států
it:Aviation Section, U.S. Signal Corps